This is a list of Pakistani national cricket captains who have represented the Pakistani national cricket team in international cricket at a professional level. Pakistan became an official member of the Imperial Cricket Conference (now the International Cricket Council) on 28 July 1950.

The position of captain in the Pakistan team has often been accused of controversy by critics, particularly in recent times, with several players being banned for unprofessional behaviour. The team's greatest successes in One Day International cricket, arrived in 1992, when they won the Cricket World Cup under the captaincy of Imran Khan. Their most important Twenty20 cricket success in recent years, came in 2009 when they won the 2009 ICC World Twenty20, under the leadership of Younis Khan and another recent important victory is the 2017 ICC Champions Trophy under the leadership of Sarfraz Ahmed. Babar Azam is the only Pakistan captain who has scored centuries in all formats as a captain. Babar Azam now has the most centuries for Pakistan as a captain.

Men's cricket

Test cricket captains
This is a list of cricketers who have captained the Pakistan national cricket team for at least one Test match (not including vice-captains and other players who have deputised on the field for any period of time during a match where the captain has been unable to play).

Where a player has a dagger (†) next to a Test match series in which he captained at least one Test, that denotes that player deputized for the appointed captain or were appointed by the home authority for a minor proportion in a series.

The current Captain is Babar Azam He was appointed in November 2020. But an injury to him made his tenure to be postponed. Mohammad Rizwan lead the Pakistan test team as 33rd captain when his team played the Boxing day test against New Zealand in Dec 2020.

Notes:
1 Asian Test Championship
2 Final of the Asian Test Championship
3 Includes one forfeited match.

Men's One Day International captains

This is a list of cricketers who have captained the Pakistan national cricket team for at least one One Day International. The table of results is complete to the end of the Micromax Asia Cup. Pakistan's most successful One Day captain in terms of number of won matches is Imran Khan, who retired after lifting the 1992 cricket World Cup. And the current Captain is Babar Azam. He was appointed in May 2020.

Men's Twenty20 International captains

This is a list of cricketers who have captained the Pakistani national cricket team for at least one Twenty20 International (T20I). Shahid Afridi was named as the T20I captain in September 2014 replacing Mohammad Hafeez and Babar Azam has now been assigned to lead team Pakistan immediately after his supercharged performances in ICC Cricket World Cup 2019.

Women's cricket

Test cricket captains

This is a list of cricketers who have captained the Pakistani women's cricket team for at least one women's Test match. The table of results is complete to the Test as of June 2005.

Women's One Day International captains

This is a list of cricketers who have captained the Pakistani women's cricket team for at least one women's one-day international. The table of results is complete as of present(2017). Pakistan have only ever competed in one World Cup, that of 1997/8, when they finished bottom of their qualifying group.
The current Captain is Bismah Maroof. She was appointed after ICC Women's World Cup 2017.

Youth cricket

Under-19 Test captains 

captained the Pakistani Under-19 cricket team for at least one under-19 Test match. The table of results is complete to the second Test against Sri Lanka in 2004/5. A cricketer who has a symbol of ♠ next to a Test match series describes their role as captain and their participation in at least one game for the team. The rules of the Under-19 cricket describes no youth, captains the side for more than one year.
The current Captain is Qasim Akram. He is appointed in April 2021.

Under-19 One Day International captains

This is a list of cricketers who have captained the Pakistani Under-19 cricket team for at least one Under-19 One Day International. 
The current Captain is Qasim Akram. He is appointed in April 2021.

See also
Pakistan national cricket team
Pakistan Under-19 cricket team
Pakistan national women's cricket team

References

CricketArchive
ESPN cricinfo

External links
Pakistan Cricket Board

National
 
Pakistan
Cricket Captains